Marathon Man is a 1976 American thriller film directed by John Schlesinger. It was adapted by William Goldman from his 1974 novel of the same title and stars Dustin Hoffman, Laurence Olivier, Roy Scheider, William Devane and Marthe Keller. In the film, "Babe" Levy, a graduate student (Hoffman), becomes embroiled in a plot by Nazi war criminal Christian Szell (Olivier) to retrieve stolen diamonds from a safe deposit box owned by Szell's dead brother. Babe becomes unwittingly involved due to his brother Doc's (Scheider) dealings with Szell. It was a critical and box office success, with Olivier earning an Oscar nomination for Best Supporting Actor for his role as Szell, the film's antagonist.

Plot

Thomas "Babe" Levy is a history Ph.D. candidate and avid runner researching the same field as his father, who committed suicide after being investigated during the Joseph McCarthy era. Babe's brother, Henry, known as "Doc", poses as an oil company executive but is actually a government agent working for a secret agency headed by Peter Janeway.

When Klaus Szell, the brother  of a Nazi war criminal, is killed in a traffic accident, Doc suspects that the criminal, Dr. Christian Szell, will come to New York to retrieve a valuable diamond collection. Doc comes to New York under the guise of a visit to Babe. Meanwhile, Babe and his new girlfriend, Elsa Opel, who claims to be from Switzerland, are mugged by two men dressed in suits. When Doc takes Babe and Elsa to lunch, he tricks Elsa into revealing that she has been lying to Babe about her background. Though Doc suspects she may be connected to Szell, he tells Babe that she is seeking an American husband so that she can become a U.S. citizen. After Szell arrives in America, Doc confronts him, stating he is not welcome in the country. Szell accepts the pronouncement, but then stabs Doc with a blade concealed in his sleeve. Doc goes back to Babe's apartment and dies in his brother’s arms.

The police interrogate Babe until government agents, led by Janeway, arrive. Janeway asks Babe what Doc told him before he died, and tells Babe that his brother was a U.S. government agent. Babe insists that his brother did not tell him anything, but Janeway is convinced Doc would not have struggled all the way to Babe's apartment without giving him vital information.

Babe is later abducted from his apartment by the two men who mugged him in the park, and he is tortured by Szell. During his torture, Babe is repeatedly asked, "Is it safe?", but he continues to deny any knowledge. Babe is then rescued by Janeway, who explains that Szell is in America to sell off a large cache of diamonds which he had taken from Jews killed at Auschwitz. Janeway presses Babe about Doc's dying words, but Babe still insists he knows nothing. Frustrated, Janeway reveals himself as a double agent and returns Babe to Szell. Still unable to extract anything from Babe, Szell drills into one of his healthy teeth. Babe eventually escapes, aided by his skills as a marathon runner.

Babe phones Elsa, who agrees to meet him with a car. Arriving at a country home, Babe guesses that Elsa has set him up, forcing her to confess that the home was owned by Szell's deceased brother. Janeway and Szell's men, Karl and Erhard arrive, but Babe takes Elsa hostage. Janeway kills Karl and Erhard as they attempt to shoot Babe and offers to let Babe kill Szell in revenge for Doc's death, if Janeway can have the diamonds. Babe agrees, but as he takes off, Elsa makes an effort to warn Babe of getting shot and Janeway tries to shoot Babe, but kills Elsa instead. Babe then fires through the window and kills Janeway.

Attempting to determine the value of his diamonds, Szell visits an appraiser in the Diamond District in midtown Manhattan. A shop assistant who is a Holocaust survivor believes he recognizes Szell as a war criminal. After Szell hurriedly leaves the shop, an elderly Jewish woman also recognizes him. Trying to cross the street to get closer to Szell, the woman is hit by a taxi, causing a crowd to assemble to aid her. Amidst the confusion, the shop assistant appears again, directly confronting Szell, who slits the man's throat.

Szell retrieves his diamonds but, as he attempts to leave the bank, Babe forces him at gunpoint into Central Park. Babe tells Szell he can keep as many diamonds as he can swallow. Szell initially refuses, and Babe begins throwing the diamonds into the water. Szell relents and swallows one diamond, but then refuses to cooperate further. When Szell moves for the kill, Babe throws the rest of the diamonds down the steps towards the water; Szell dives for them, but stumbles, impales himself on his switchblade then falls into the water. Babe heads out into Central Park, stopping to throw his gun into the reservoir.

Cast

Production
Goldman was paid a reported $500,000 for the film rights to his novel and to do a screenplay, before the novel had been published. (Another source said $450,000.)

"The book reads like the movie-movie of all time", said producer Robert Evans. "I regard it as a cheap investment because you don't often find books that translate into film. This is the best thing I've read since The Godfather. It could go all, all the way – if we don't foul it up in the making."

Goldman estimated he wrote four versions of the screenplay and says Robert Towne was brought in at the end.

Goldman says John Schlesinger only agreed to do the film because he had just finished The Day of the Locust and was "terrified he was dead in Hollywood."

Laurence Olivier was cast early on. However he had health problems, and at one stage, it was uncertain whether he would be able to do the film. Richard Widmark auditioned for the part, but Olivier eventually recovered and was able to participate in filming.

Marathon Man was the second feature film production in which inventor/operator Garrett Brown used his then-new Steadicam, after Bound for Glory. However, it was the first feature using the Steadicam that saw theatrical release, predating the premieres of both Bound for Glory and Rocky by two months. This new camera stabilization system was used extensively in Marathon Mans running and chase scenes on the streets of New York City.

The movie was filmed from October 1975 to February 1976.

"Why don't you just try acting?"

Marathon Man is famous in acting circles for an often quoted exchange between Hoffman and Olivier concerning a perceived difference in their approaches to acting.

In the usual telling of the story Hoffman, a proponent of method acting, prepared for a scene where his character had been awake for three days by doing the same himself. Following much goading and verbal-bullying by Hoffman of Olivier, who criticized Olivier for not being as committed to his art as Hoffman, Olivier suggested "why don't you just try acting?" In an interview on Inside the Actors Studio, Hoffman said that this exchange had been distorted: he had been up all night at the Studio 54 nightclub for personal rather than professional reasons and Olivier, who understood this, was joking.

Themes
The film explores themes of endurance and the pursuit of Nazi war criminals.  Some critics believed that the violence exhibited was necessary to the film and to the character of Babe. Other critics found the violence to be offensive. Critic Pauline Kael considered the film a "Jewish revenge fantasy". The nickname given to Laurence Olivier's character, "der weiße Engel" (The White Angel) was inspired by Nazi doctor Josef Mengele, known as the "Angel of Death" or also, "der weiße Engel" because when he stood on the platform of arrivals to concentration camps, he looked like a "white angel" directing victims to their deaths.

Babe originally has childish traits. As the film progresses, these childish traits are replaced with more adult ones. Michelle Citron of Jump Cut compared Babe to Carrie White in the 1976 film Carrie.

Janeway is only interested in his own gain instead of the ideal to advance U.S. interests. Paul Cobley stated in The American Thriller: Generic Innovation and Social Change in the 1970s that Janeway "can be read as the impersonality of late capitalism[...] or a post-Foucaldian embodiment of the shifting locations of power" or "a representative of the vicissitudes of the market". Cobley identifies Melendez and his group as Janeway's "nemesis".

Music 
John Schlesinger asked composer Michael Small to make music that matched the theme of "pain, and the endurance of pain".

The opera Hérodiade by Jules Massenet is featured in the scene that takes place at the Paris Opera (Act III scene 8, Dors, ô cité perverse !... Astres étincelants, sung by Joseph Rouleau with the orchestra of the Royal Opera House conducted by John Matheson, published on Decca Records).

Reception
The film was a financial and critical success. Olivier's performance was particularly praised. Rotten Tomatoes gives the film an approval rating of 82% based on 44 reviews, with an average rating of 7.4/10. The consensus reads, "Marathon Man runs the gamut from patient mystery to pulse-pounding thriller, aided by Laurence Olivier's coldly terrifying performance and a brainy script by William Goldman." Roger Ebert gave Marathon Man 3 out of a possible 4 stars. He wrote: "If holes in plots bother you, 'Marathon Man' will be maddening. But as well-crafted escapist entertainment, as a diabolical thriller, the movie works with relentless skill."

Accolades

Cultural influence
Dr. Szell was ranked as villain #34 on the American Film Institute's "100 Years... 100 Heroes and Villains" list. The film itself was ranked #50 on the "100 Years...100 Thrills" list. He was also ranked in Time as one of the 25 greatest movie villains. Both the novel and film contain a graphic depiction in which Szell tortures Babe by first probing a cavity in one of Babe's teeth with a curette, and later drilling into another tooth, without anesthetic, while repeatedly asking the question "Is it safe?" The quote "Is it safe?" was ranked #70 on the "100 Years...100 Movie Quotes" list. The dental torture scene was named #66 on Bravo's 100 Scariest Movie Moments.  The torture scene has been described as one of the most frightening sequences in film. Critics have remarked on the high level of talent and class.

Director Schlesinger said that Marathon Man was successful not only because it had elements of escapism, but also because the audience easily identified with Babe Levy. Schlesinger said that he "is definitely someone that you can root for. The film is about his survival in a grim and hostile world. In our present age of anxiety we can all identify with characters who are not trying to get ahead but simply to survive."

Deleted violent scenes
Although the first preview of the movie was successful, the second one in San Francisco did not go well. The audience complained about all the violent scenes, so director John Schlesinger and editor Jim Clark chose to delete the following scenes and shots: the scene near the beginning of the film in which Doc fights with two assassins who have killed his friend; the graphic and gory close-ups of Szell disemboweling Doc with his wrist blade; and both of the torture scenes, which were heavily cut. Graphic insert shots from the torture scenes, which were filmed by Clark, were removed. Some photos, such as original lobby cards and stills, show Szell torturing Babe longer with dental instruments in the first torture scene and actual onscreen drilling of Babe's tooth in the second torture scene.

Stanley Kauffmann of The New Republic wrote-'While people said that the violence in Marathon Man was excessive, I was surprised: I had wriggled through that dental torture, but it hadn't seemed a pinnacle in a year during which I had seen two penises cut off and another penis nailed to a board—in films from France and Japan'.

Differences from the novel
An 8½-minute sequence was shot of Doc fighting with some men who kill a spy colleague of his. William Goldman speculated that the scene was cut because of its violence and called the cut "grievous" and to the detriment of the film. With the sequence missing, Doc's character seems to be less flawed than he really is.

In the novel, Janeway and  Doc are homosexual lovers. This is handled subtly in the movie (when Doc arrives in Paris he calls Janeway on the phone and says "Janie, I miss you. Get your ass over here (to the hotel room)." In the book, their sexual relationship is not subtle at all and has Doc pining for Janeway at several points in the book.

The ending was rewritten by Robert Towne; it has been speculated that this was because Hoffman was unhappy with it. Goldman told an interviewer he thought the new, more famous ending was "shit" because it left out two important plot clarifications. The final confrontation between Babe and Szell, in particular, is changed: in the film, Babe "spares" Szell in a pump room, tries forcing him to swallow his diamonds and Szell then falls on his own retractable blade, dying. In the novel, Babe resolutely leads Szell to Central Park and shoots him multiple times, subsequently lecturing him. He then throws the diamonds away and is quietly led away by a policeman.

Notes

References

Further reading
 Kerner, Aaron. Film and the Holocaust: New Perspectives on Dramas, Documentaries, and Experimental Films. Continuum International Publishing Group, May 5, 2011. 169–173. , .

External links

 
 
 
 

1976 films
1970s crime thriller films
1970s political thriller films
American crime thriller films
American political thriller films
Films about brothers
Films about dentistry
Films about Jews and Judaism
Films about murderers
Films about Nazi fugitives
Films based on American novels
Films based on works by William Goldman
Films directed by John Schlesinger
Films featuring a Best Supporting Actor Golden Globe winning performance
Films produced by Robert Evans
Films scored by Michael Small
Films set in New York City
Films set in Columbia University
Films set in Paris
Films set in Uruguay
Films shot in Los Angeles
Films shot in New York City
Films shot in Paris
Films with screenplays by William Goldman
Paramount Pictures films
Torture in films
1970s English-language films
1970s American films